"Joy" is a song by English singer-songwriter Mick Jagger. It was released as a track on his fourth solo album, Goddess in the Doorway (2001). Rolling Stone called it "a rocking, gospel-tinged collaboration with Bono of U2" - featuring Pete Townshend on guitar. "Joy" was one of three tracks from Goddess in the Doorway to be featured on Jagger's greatest hits album, The Very Best of Mick Jagger.

References

External links 
 Album credits at Discogs

Mick Jagger songs
Songs written by Mick Jagger
2001 songs